The Gare de Sommery (Sommery station) is a railway station located in the commune of Sommery in the Seine-Maritime department, France.  The station is served by TER Normandie and TER Hauts-de-France trains from Amiens to Rouen.

References

See also

List of SNCF stations in Normandy

Railway stations in Seine-Maritime